Benjamin Franklin Terry (February 18, 1821 – December 17, 1861) raised and commanded the 8th Texas Cavalry Regiment, popularly known as Terry's Texas Rangers, during the American Civil War. An enslaver, planter and prominent citizen of Fort Bend County, he organized the regiment for the Confederate States Army. Terry was killed in the regiment's first action at Rowlett's Station near Woodsonville, Kentucky.

Family
Born on February 18, 1821, in Russellville, Kentucky, the son of Joseph R. and Sarah David (Smith) Terry. His grandfathers, Nathaniel Terry and David Smith, had been officers in the American Revolutionary War, and the latter also served under Andrew Jackson in the War of 1812.  His uncle, Benjamin Fort Smith, served on staff with Andrew Jackson at the Battle of New Orleans and later as adjutant for General Sam Houston during the Texas Revolution.

Terry's family moved to Brazoria County, Texas when he was a boy. One brother David S. Terry later moved to California and served on that state's Supreme Court. A second brother Clinton Terry became an attorney at Brazoria. In 1851–53, using slave labor, Terry participated in the building of Texas's first railroad, the Buffalo Bayou, Brazos, and Colorado Railway.

With his business partner William F. Kyle, Terry bought the 2,500-acre Oakland plantation for $25 per acre in 1853. Paying off the debt by 1858, he successfully farmed cotton and sugar cane and raised a family at the plantation in Sugar Land, Fort Bend County, Texas. In 1860, Terry and his 38-year-old wife Mary had six children, David, age 17, Mary, 12, Frank Jr., 10, Sally, 7, Kyle, 5 and Cornelia, 2. In 1862, his brother Clinton joined the Confederate Army and was killed at the Battle of Shiloh. His son Kyle later became deeply involved in the Jaybird-Woodpecker War and was shot to death in the Galveston courthouse in 1890.

Career
By reason of his wealth, large physical size, and popularity, Frank Terry became a leader in Fort Bend County. On January 9, 1861, he was elected a delegate to the Secession Convention in Austin. Terry and two fellow delegates, Thomas S. Lubbock and John A. Wharton, conceived the idea of organizing at least one company of Texas cavalrymen for the new government.

In February and March 1861 Terry was one of the senior officers aiding John Salmon Ford and Ebenezar B. Nichols in the campaign to disarm the federal troops at Brazos Santiago. In June 1861 Terry, Lubbock, Wharton, and perhaps as many as fifty other Texans sailed from Galveston to New Orleans and then caught the train to Richmond to offer their services to the Confederate Army. In Richmond Terry and Lubbock secured positions as volunteer aides to General James Longstreet. Both men were appointed colonel, a term attached as a courtesy for their volunteer service, and participated with distinction in the First Battle of Bull Run.

Afterward, the Confederate States War Department granted the authority to organize a cavalry regiment. At Houston on August 12, 1861, Terry and Lubbock issued a call for volunteers that was answered by 1,170 men. The rangers were sworn into service in September, but Terry delayed their final organization until late November, when they were officially designated the Eighth Texas Cavalry. The regiment started immediately for Virginia but en route was diverted to Nashville, Tennessee and then later ordered to Bowling Green, Kentucky.

On December 17, 1861, Terry led the regiment into the Battle of Rowlett's Station near Woodsonville, Kentucky. While the battle ended in a Confederate victory, Colonel Terry was mortally wounded. His remains were sent by train to Nashville, where the state legislature adjourned and joined the procession escorting his body to lay in state at the Tennessee Capitol. Terry's body also lay in state in New Orleans and Houston, where the procession was described as "the most imposing ever seen in this state." Governor Lubbock praised Terry in the state senate, saying that "no braver man ever lived-no truer patriot ever died."

Tributes
Terry County, Texas, is named after him, as is B. F. Terry High School in Rosenberg, Texas.

References

TerrysTexasRangers.org

External links
 Benjamin Franklin Terry at Handbook of Texas Online
 

1821 births
1861 deaths
Burials at Glenwood Cemetery (Houston, Texas)
People from Russellville, Kentucky
People from Sugar Land, Texas
People of Kentucky in the American Civil War
People of Texas in the American Civil War
Confederate States Army officers
Confederate States of America military personnel killed in the American Civil War
American slave owners
Terry County, Texas
Military personnel from Texas